Year 258 (CCLVIII) was a common year starting on Friday (link will display the full calendar) of the Julian calendar. At the time, it was known as the Year of the Consulship of Tuscus and Bassus (or, less frequently, year 1011 Ab urbe condita). The denomination 258 for this year has been used since the early medieval period, when the Anno Domini calendar era became the prevalent method in Europe for naming years.

Events 
<onlyinclude>

By place

Roman Empire 
 The Goths ravage Asia Minor and Trapezus.
 The amount of silver in the Roman currency of the denarius falls below 10%. The crisis ruins craftsmen, tradesmen, and small farmers, who are forced into bartering; landowners grow richer by buying up cheap land.
 Valerian II, eldest son of Gallienus, dies, possibly murdered by Pannonia's governor Ingenuus; Emperor Valerian bestows on another one of Gallienus's sons, Saloninus, the title of Caesar.  
 A second Imperial edict prohibits Christianity in the Roman Empire.  This edict divides Christians into four categories: priests, who are to be put to death; senators and equestrians, who are to be stripped of their positions and their property confiscated; nuns, who are to be exiled; and imperial civil servants, who are condemned to forced labour.

Asia 
 Sima Zhao quells Zhuge Dan's rebellion, thereby also ending what are known as the Three Rebellions in Shouchun.
 Sun Xiu succeeds his brother Sun Liang as emperor of the Chinese state of Eastern Wu.

By topic

Religion 
 Cyprian, bishop of Carthage, is martyred (decapitation).
 Pope Sixtus II, bishop of Rome, is martyred.

Births 
 Clement of Ancyra, Christian bishop and martyr (d. 312)

Deaths 
 August 6 – Sixtus II, bishop of Rome
 September 14 – Cyprian, bishop of Carthage
 Anak the Parthian, Parthian nobleman
 Chen Zhi (or Fengzong), Chinese politician
 Novatian, Italian antipope and theologian
 Valerian II, son of co-emperor Gallienus
 Zhuge Dan (or Gongxiu), Chinese general

References